Bohdan Zamostianyk (born 3 February 1975) is a Ukrainian bobsledder. He competed in the four man event at the 2002 Winter Olympics.

References

1975 births
Living people
Ukrainian male bobsledders
Olympic bobsledders of Ukraine
Bobsledders at the 2002 Winter Olympics
Sportspeople from Kyiv